Bastasi may refer to:
 Bastasi, Banja Luka, Bosnia and Herzegovina
 Bastasi, Bosansko Grahovo, Bosnia and Herzegovina
 Bastasi, Drvar, Bosnia and Herzegovina
 Bastasi, Foča, Bosnia and Herzegovina